A Cauldron of Witches is a 1988 anthology of 12 fairy tales from around the world that have been collected and retold by Ruth Manning-Sanders. It was the final published book in a long series of such anthologies by author Manning-Sanders, who died in October 1988 at age 102.

Table of contents
Foreword
1. The Little Grey Donkey (Sweden)
2. The Amber Witch (Norway)
3. Witch Longnose and her Cat Periwinkle (Cornwall)
4. The Witch in the Wood (Germany)
5. Wolfgang and the Witches (Bohemia)
6. Tow-how and the Witch (Papua New Guinea)
7. Martin and the Lions (Tyrol)
8. The Giant on the Mount (France)
9. Elsa and the Witch (Russia)
10. The Witch's Flute (Bulgaria)
11. The Whirlwind's Castle (Finland)
12. Moti-katika and the Water Witch (South-east Africa)

1988 short story collections
1988 children's books
Collections of fairy tales
Children's short story collections
Witchcraft in fairy tales
British children's books
British short story collections
Methuen Publishing books
Books about cats
1988 anthologies